Gerard Rissik (21 February 1903 – 4 October 1979) was the fourth Governor of the South African Reserve Bank. His term of office was from 1 July 1962 to 30 June 1967. He was succeeded by Dr. Theunis Willem de Jongh.

References

1903 births
1979 deaths
Governors of the South African Reserve Bank
20th-century South African businesspeople
20th-century South African economists